The Government Finance Officers Association of Texas (or GFOAT) is a professional association of state, county, and local government finance officers in Texas.  The Government Finance Officers Association of Texas is the statewide organization serving all Texas municipal finance professionals, an affiliate of the nationwide Government Finance Officers Association (GFOA).  Membership is open to anyone in the State of Texas actively engaged in government finance in any city, county, or special district.  Its stated mission is to enhance the quality of local government finance, to assist and support local government finance professionals in Texas, and to promote the public service profession.  GFOAT members are actively involved in the key issues facing cities, counties, and special districts in the State of Texas.

The Chief Financial Officers Act of 1990(CFO Act) was signed into law by President George H. W. Bush. For each of 23 federal agencies, the position of chief financial officer was created. Since that time, federal efforts have been intended to improve the government's financial management and develop standards of financial performance and disclosure. Similar financial expectations exist at State and Local government levels.

The chief financial officer (CFO) of a public agency is the corporate officer primarily responsible for managing the financial risks of the business or agency. This officer is also responsible for budgeting, financial planning, record-keeping, cash flow management, higher management. communicating financial performance and forecasts to the community. The title may vary, such as finance director or treasurer, from agency to agency. The CFO typically reports to the city manager or other chief executive officer.

Financial reporting has multiple audiences, with a responsibility to citizens, taxpayers and voters to provide transparent accountability for use of public funds (taxes).  Additionally, financial reporting must provide internal guidance to program managers to maintain budgetary control and to governing city councils and boards of directors to provide adequate financial policy guidelines.

The United States government in general has sought to improve the quality of financial reporting.  The Government Accounting Standards Board (GASB) has a stated mission to "establish and improve standards of state and local governmental accounting and financial reporting that will result in useful information for users of financial reports and guide and educate the public, including issuers, auditors, and users of those financial reports." Pronouncements in particular have trended to incorporate more comparable elements of business-sector.

The need for and value of financial managers has increased. Over the past decades, a number of factors have created a rapidly changing environment for today's government financial managers.  Beginning with the New York City financial crisis in the 1970s and 1980s, state and local governments began overhauling their financial management systems. In 1990, the Chief Financial Officers (CFO) act called for reforms that brought the goal of accountability to the forefront.  The 1994 Bankruptcy of Orange County, California further underscored the need for ongoing excellence and expertise in the field of municipal finance.

Role of GFOAT membership
Members are finance directors and treasurers of municipalities and other local government agencies, whether elected or appointed, having responsibility for collection, receipt, reporting, custody, investment or disbursement of municipal funds.  Municipal funding sources are commonly property tax, sales tax, income tax, utility users tax (UUT), transient occupancy tax (hotel occupancy), and user fees such as licensing and permit fees.

Glenn Hegar is the Texas Comptroller of Public Accounts of the State of Texas.  The office of Texas State Treasurer was established in the Constitution of 1876.  It superseded a similar office in the Republic of Texas. The treasurer was elected to serve for four years as head of the State Treasury Department.  The office was abolished by Texas voters in 1995 and was formally closed in 1996, with duties taken over by the Texas Comptroller of Public Accounts.

Texas has 254 counties, by far the most counties of any state.  As of 2000, six Texas cities had populations greater than 500,000. The two largest are Dallas and Houston. Texas has the most cities with populations exceeding 1,000,000 of any state: Dallas, Houston, San Antonio. These three rank among the 10 most populous cities of the United States. Austin, Fort Worth, and El Paso are among the 25 largest U.S. cities. Texas has 25 metropolitan areas, four of which have populations greater than 1,000,000: Dallas-Fort Worth, Houston, San Antonio and Austin-Round Rock. The Dallas-Fort Worth and Houston metropolitan areas each has about 5 million residents. 

Many city treasurers are elected, and are therefore directly accountable to their constituents; the remainder are appointed either by city council or city manager.  Finance directors typically are appointed by the city manager.

In addition to cities and counties, Texas has numerous special districts. The most common is the independent school district, which (with one exception) has a board of trustees that is independent of any other governing authority. Other special districts include Groundwater Conservation Districts (regulatory agencies), river authorities, water supply districts (for irrigation or municipal supply), public hospitals, road districts and community colleges.

Professional standards setting
Certification is a guide for municipal finance directors and treasurers to become valued administrators in local government.  GFOAT encourages professional certification for public finance directors and treasurers who meet standards of education, experience and commitment to a code of ethics.  GFOAT offers its own post-nominal professional certificate, the Certified Government Finance Officer (CGFO) similar to the GFOA-administered the Certified Professional Finance Officer (CPFO), and Certified Government Financial Manager (CGFM) certification in Federal, State and Local Government Financial excellence from the Association of Government Accountants (AGA).

GFOAT code of ethics
All government finance officer members are enjoined to adhere to legal, moral and professional standards of conduct in the fulfillment of their professional responsibilities. Standards of professional conduct as set forth in this code are promulgated in order to enhance the performance of all persons engaged in public finance.:

I. Personal Standards 
Government finance officers shall demonstrate and be dedicated to the highest ideals of honor and integrity in all public and personal relationships to merit the respect, trust and confidence of governing officials, other public officials, employees, and of I he public.
They shall devote their time, skills and energies to their office both independently and in cooperation with other professionals.
They shall abide by approved professional practices and recommended standards.

II. Responsibility as Public Officials 
Government finance officers shall recognize and be accountable for their responsibilities as officials in the public sector.
They shall be sensitive and responsive to the rights of the public and its changing needs.
They shall strive to provide the highest quality of performance and counsel.
They shall exercise prudence and integrity in the management of funds in their custody and in all financial transactions.
They shall uphold both the letter and the spirit of the constitution, legislation and regulations governing their actions and report violations of the law to the appropriate authorities.

III. Professional Development 
Government finance officers shall be responsible for maintaining their own competence, for enhancing the competence of their colleagues, and for providing encouragement to those seeking to enter the field of government finance. Finance officers shall promote excellence in the public service.

IV. Professional Integrity-Information
Government finance officers shall demonstrate professional integrity in the issuance and management of information.
They shall not knowingly sign, subscribe to, or permit the issuance of any statement or report which contains any misstatement or which omits any material fact.
They shall prepare and present statements and financial information pursuant to applicable law and generally accepted practices and guidelines.
They shall respect and protect privileged information to which they have accessed by virtue of their office.
They shall be sensitive and responsible to inquiries from the public and the media, within the framework of state or local government policy.

V. Professional Integrity-Relationships
Government finance officers shall act with honor, integrity and virtue in all professional relationships.
They shall exhibit loyalty and trust in the affairs and interests of the government they serve, within the confines of this Code of Ethics.
They shall not knowingly be a party to or condone any illegal or improper activity.
They shall respect the rights, responsibilities and integrity of their colleagues and other public officials with whom they work and associate.
They shall manage all matters of personnel within the scope of their authority so that fairness and impartiality govern their decisions.
They shall promote equal employment opportunities, and in doing so, oppose any discrimination, harassment or other unfair practices.

VI. Conflict of Interest
Government finance officers shall actively avoid the appearance of or the fact of conflicting interest.
They shall discharge their duties without favor and shall refrain from engaging in any outside matters of financial or personal interest incompatible with the impartial and objective performance of their duties.
They shall not, directly or indirectly, seek or accept personal gain which would influence, or appear to influence, the conduct of their official duties.
They shall not use public property or resources for personal or political gains.

Training and education in Texas finance and treasury
GFOAT's annual statewide conferences provide an array of education across many topics and alternate annually between various northern and southern cities.  By assembling leadership from a broad representation of government agencies and also bringing in subject matter experts in various disciplines, the collective expertise and professionalism of financial managers and policymakers is enhanced and improved.

Statewide financial leadership
GFOAT is recognized as a leading source of expert knowledge in public financial management by exercising leadership in research, recommended practice and policy development, and information dissemination.  Nationwide recognition is furthered through a continued association with the nationwide Government Finance Officers Association (GFOA).  Statewide recognition is furthered through a thorough participation of members drawn from many cities, counties and special districts.

Standing committees
Financial Leadership is furthered by engaging in efforts to assist statewide finance officers to develop the skills and capabilities necessary to enable them to become organizational leaders as well as technical experts.

Resources
GFOAT seeks to facilitate interagency communication for the purposes of sharing information and best practices, cooperating with and complementing the services provided by other organizations to increase the effectiveness of all.

Like GFOA nationwide, GFOAT sponsors award programs designed to encourage good financial reporting in Texas, for financial documents including the Comprehensive annual financial report, or CAFR, and the annual budget.

GFOAT provides technology information and analytical tools to help governments identify and apply appropriate, economical technologies to support efficient resource allocation, quality services, and effective decision making and to promote citizen involvement.

See also
 American Institute of Certified Public Accountants (AICPA) Private Sector Accounting
  Governmental Accounting Standards Board (GASB)
  Government Finance Officers Association (GFOA)

References

External links

Government of Texas
Government-related professional associations in the United States
Professional certification in finance
Public administration
Government finances in the United States
1955 establishments in Texas